Aron Kincaid (born Norman Neale Williams II; June 15, 1940 – January 6, 2011) was an American actor, known for voicing Killer Croc on Batman: The Animated Series  and Sky Lynx on The Transformers. He also voiced characters for The Smurfs, and DuckTales, among others.  In his later years he also had careers as a model and an artist.

Career

Kincaid was born Norman Neale Williams II. His father, a second lieutenant in the Army Air Forces, died during World War II. His mother remarried and moved to Oakland, California, where Kincaid graduated from Oakland High School. After graduation, he served in the United States Coast Guard reserve. 

While attending UCLA, Kincaid was spotted in a local stage production by a casting agent and signed to a contract with Universal Pictures. That led to a brief, uncredited performance in Spartacus. Kincaid then landed a regular role in the final season of the television sitcom Bachelor Father (1962) as Warren Dawson, Bentley Gregg's junior partner and fiancé of Kelly, Gregg's niece.

Kincaid subsequently appeared with Corcoran in the 1965 comedy The Girls on the Beach and had roles in Beach Ball and Ski Party and made what was billed as a "guest appearance" in Dr. Goldfoot and the Bikini Machine. He was strongly considered for the lead of The Graduate before director Mike Nichols chose Dustin Hoffman; Kincaid's agent turned down a cameo to play Katharine Ross's groom in the film 

His other film roles include the Disney musical The Happiest Millionaire, The Proud and the Damned and Silent Night, Deadly Night. He also made guest appearances on TV series such as The Beverly Hillbillies, Family Affair, and Get Smart. He moved to San Francisco in the early 1970s and launcheda successful career as a model.

Still later, as an artist, Kincaid used the name N.N. Williams II. He sold his landscapes and seascapes through galleries in Laguna Beach, California.

Kincaid, a resident of Beverly Hills, died at age 70 on January 6, 2011 at the Ronald Reagan UCLA Hospital from a heart-related condition.

Selected filmography

As actor
The Fall of Nineveh (1957)
The Wasp Woman (1959) - Beekeeper Renfrew (uncredited)
Spartacus (1960) - Crassus' standard-bearer (uncredited)
The Girls on the Beach (1965) - Wayne
Beach Ball (1965) - Jack
Ski Party (1965) - Freddie Carter
Dr. Goldfoot and the Bikini Machine (1965) - Motorist Who Hits Diane
The Wild Weird World of Dr. Goldfoot (1965, TV Short) - Agent 00½
 Patty Duke Show (1966) - Harold Wilson
The Ghost in the Invisible Bikini (1966) - Bobby
The Happiest Millionaire (1967) - Walter Blakely
The Secret Sharer (1967)
Creature of Destruction (1967) - Capt. Theodore Dell
Get Smart (1968) - Herb Talbot
The New Wife (1968) - Only Anglo
The Proud and the Damned (1972) - Ike
Gable and Lombard (1976) - Party Guest #3
Cannonball (1976) - David
Brave New World (1980) as J. Edgar Millhouse
Silent Night, Deadly Night (1984) - Obnoxious Deejay (uncredited)
The Golden Child (1986) - Informer (uncredited)

As a voice actor
The Smurfs (1981)
Hulk Hogan's Rock 'n' Wrestling (1985) - The Iron Shiek
Transformers (1985) - Sky Lynx, Mark Morgan, Sweep
DuckTales (1987) - Fritter O' Way (episode: "Down and Out in Duckburg")
Batman: The Animated Series (1992) - Killer Croc / Waylon Jones, Lucas
Teenage Mutant Ninja Turtles (1994) - Glaxon Captain ("Cyber Turtles")
Freakazoid! (1995) - Nerdator

References

External links

Aron Kincaid at Brian's Drive-In Theatre

1940 births
2011 deaths
American male child actors
American male film actors
American male voice actors
Male actors from Los Angeles
United States Coast Guard reservists